Chah Bahar is a city in Sistan and Baluchestan Province, Iran

Chah Bahar may also refer to:

 Chah Bahar County, in Sistan and Balcuhestan Province
 Chah Bahar, Komijan, Markazi, Iran
 Chah Bahar, Saveh, Markazi, Iran